Lukáš Mičulka (born April 8, 1989 in Kopřivnice) is a Czech professional ice hockey player. He played with HC Oceláři Třinec in the Czech Extraliga during the 2010–11 Czech Extraliga season.

References

External links

1989 births
Czech ice hockey forwards
HC Oceláři Třinec players
Living people
People from Kopřivnice
Sportspeople from the Moravian-Silesian Region
Hokej Šumperk 2003 players
VHK Vsetín players
Deggendorfer SC players
Saale Bulls Halle players
Czech expatriate ice hockey players in Germany
Naturalized citizens of Germany